Local elections were held in Tonga for the first time in June 1965.

Background
Tongan government administration consisted of Town Officers representing the government in a single village, whilst District Officers usually served around six villages. Prior to the elections, the officers had been appointed by the Premier.

References

Elections in Tonga
Tonga
June 1965 events in Oceania